Dapcha Chatrebangh is a historic and beautiful village located in Namobuddha Municipality in Kavrepalanchok District in Bagmati Province of central Nepal.  It is located about 15 kilometres southeast of the district headquarters of Dhulikhel. The municipality office is located at Bhakunde Beshi. The Buddhist temple "Namobuddha" and other various Hindu temples are located in this village. Mt. Gaurishankar can be clearly seen from most of the part of this village. Most of people in this village are of Hindu and Buddhist religions. There are also some Christian and Islam families.

External links 
 UN map of the municipalities of Kavrepalanchok District

Populated places in Kavrepalanchok District